The following is a list of events affecting Philippine television in 1976. Events listed include television show debuts, finales, cancellations, and channel launches, closures and rebrandings, as well as information about controversies and carriage disputes.

Premieres

Unknown
 Gameworld on IBC 13
 Kahapon Lamang on GMA
 Suerte sa Siete on GMA
 Interaction on GMA
 Sine Siyete on GMA
 Kumpletos Recados on RPN 9

Programs transferring networks

Finales
 October 29: GMA Evening Report on GMA
 October 31: GMA News Roundup on GMA
 December 21: PBA on BBC on BBC 2

Unknown
 Katuwaan sa Siyete on GMA
 Baltic & Co on GMA
 Talagang Ganyan on GMA
 Ito na Kami on GMA
 Zarda on RPN 9
 Fantastik Jeanne in Motion on RPN 9

Births
January 22 – TJ Trinidad
February 2 – Ana Roces
February 7 – Chito Miranda
February 11 – Jao Mapa
February 18 – January Isaac
February 19 – Victor Neri
March 25 – Leandro Muñoz
March 28 – Roselle Nava
March 31 – Vice Ganda
April 2 – Geneva Cruz
April 4 – Bearwin Meily
May 2 – Alicia Mayer
June 4 – Buwi Meneses
August 11 – Jhong Hilario
August 16 – Jomari Yllana
September 6 – Mylene Dizon
September 22 – Wowie de Guzman
October 27 – Joanne Santos
November 18 – Gio Alvarez
November 30 – Bobby Andrews
December 3 – Bernard Palanca
December 7 – Derek Ramsay
December 13 – Radha Cuadrado
December 23 – Ivan Mayrina

See also 
 1976 in television

References 

Television in the Philippines by year
1976 in the Philippines